Emilia Gubitosi (b. 3 Feb 1887, d. 17 Jan 1972) was an Italian pianist and composer.

Life
Emilia Gubitosi was born in Naples and studied music with Beniamino Cesi, Costantino Palumbo, Fromesco Simonetti, Camillo De Nardis and Nicola D'Arienzo at the Conservatorio San Pietro a Majella in Naples, graduating in 1906 with a diploma in piano and in 1906 as the first woman graduate in composition.

After completing her studies, she worked as a concert pianist in Europe. She married composer Franco Michele Napolitano and worked for a while as a music administrator. In 1914 she took a position teaching at the Conservatory, where she remained until 1957. She assisted with the symphony orchestra in Naples and directed the associated choir school. In 1918 she helped to found the Associazione Musicale Alessandro Scarlatti in Naples to increase awareness of early Italian music. She died in Naples.

Works
Gubitosi composed mostly large-scale works for orchestra, but also chamber works and songs. Selected works include:
Concerto for piano and orchestra (1917 ; publ. 1943)
Allegro appassionato for violin and orchestra (1925)
Sinfonia for large orchestra (publ. 1932)
Corale sinfonico for orchestra and organ (1941)
Notturno for orchestra (1941)
Il flauto notturno, for soprano, flute and orchestra
Serenata
Dormire
Favoletta Russa (1931) for piano
Andante mosso
Fatum, 4-act opera

Gubitosi also transcribed and arranged 17th and 18th-century vocal music. She published texts, including:
Suono e ritmo (Naples, 1919) with F. M. Napolitano
Compendio di teoria musicale (Naples, 1930)

References

1887 births
1972 deaths
20th-century classical composers
Italian music educators
Women classical composers
Italian classical composers
Musicians from Naples
20th-century Italian composers
Women music educators
20th-century women composers